The Battle of Bogdat  or The Bogdat Operation was the largest battle between the Soviet partisans and the Whites (together with the 5th Japanese Expeditionary Division) during the Russian Civil War in Transbaikal.

In the summer of 1919 the local Resistance movement threatened the regime of the White Cossacks and the Japanese and it was decided to launch a massive offensive on partisan positions in Eastern Transbaikal. Eight Cossack regiments and up to 2,000 Japanese soldiers took part in the operation. The partisans had not anticipated such an offensive and were encircled near Bogdat and Homyaki villages in a day and thereafter the blockade was tightened.

Bogdat was home to the headquarters of the Eastern Transbaikalian Front headed by Pavel Zhuravlev. From September 29 to October 19 the partisans made frantic attempts to break through the encirclement. Finally, two thirds of the units managed to avoid capture and escaped.

References

Sources
 Шишкин С. И. Гражданская война на Д. Вост. — М., 1957; 
 Шерешевский Б. М. Разгром семеновщины. — Новосибирск, 1966.

Bogdat
Bogdat
History of Siberia
Bogdat
History of Zabaykalsky Krai
Japan–Russia military relations
1919 in Russia
September 1919 events
October 1919 events